Poland competed in the 2022 World Games in Birmingham, United States, from 7 to 17 July 2022. The games were originally scheduled for July 2021, but were postponed due to the rescheduling of the Tokyo 2020 Olympic Games. Athletes representing Poland won three gold medals, five silver medals and seven bronze medals. The country finished in 20th place in the medal table.

Medalists

Competitors
The following is the list of number of competitors in the Games.

Acrobatic gymnastics

Poland competed in acrobatic gymnastics.

Air sports

Poland won one silver medal in drone racing.

Archery

Poland competed in archery.

Cue sports

Poland competed in cue sports.

Canoe marathon

Poland competed in canoe marathon.

Dancesport

Poland competed in dancesport.

Finswimming

Poland won two medals in finswimming.

Ju-jitsu

Poland competed in ju-jitsu.

Kickboxing

Poland won one silver medal in kickboxing.

Lifesaving

Poland won three medals in lifesaving.

Muaythai

Poland won two medals in muaythai.

Orienteering

Poland competed in orienteering.

Powerlifting

Poland won two medals in powerlifting.

Sport climbing

Poland won one silver medal in sport climbing.

Squash

Poland competed in squash.

Sumo

Poland won three bronze medals in sumo.

Trampoline gymnastics

Poland competed in trampoline gymnastics.

References

Nations at the 2022 World Games
World Games
Poland at the World Games